Baş Kəldək (also, Bash Kel’dek) is a village and municipality in the Shaki Rayon of Azerbaijan.  It has a population of 1,111.  The municipality consists of the villages of Baş Kəldək and Aşağı Kəldək.

References 

Populated places in Shaki District